Everest Air was an airline based in Kathmandu, Nepal that provided scheduled domestic air services and chartered helicopter flights.

History 
Tha airline was originally formed as Nepal Air Charter Services. It was formed in 1992 and became defunct in 1998.

Destinations 
Everest Air regularly served the following destinations, which were cancelled either at the closure of operations or before:

Fleet 
At the time of closure, Everest Air operated the following aircraft:

Former fleet

Accidents and incidents
 1993 Everest Air Dornier 228 crash - On 31 July 1993, an Everest Air Dornier 228-101 aircraft, performing a scheduled flight from Kathmandu to Bharatpur, struck a mountain at Bharatpur. All 3 crew members and 16 passengers were killed.

References 

Defunct airlines of Nepal
Airlines established in 1992
Airlines disestablished in 1998
1992 establishments in Nepal
1998 disestablishments in Nepal